In mathematics, the affine hull or affine span of a set S in  Euclidean space Rn is the smallest affine set containing S, or equivalently, the intersection of all affine sets containing S. Here, an affine set may be defined as the translation of a vector subspace.

The affine hull aff(S) of S is the set of all affine combinations of elements of S, that is,

Examples
The affine hull of the empty set is the empty set.
The affine hull of a singleton (a set made of one single element) is the singleton itself.
The affine hull of a set of two different points is the line through them.
The affine hull of a set of three points not on one line is the plane going through them.
The affine hull of a set of four points not in a plane in R3 is the entire space R3.

Properties
For any subsets 

 
  is a closed set if  is finite dimensional.
 
 If  then .
 .
 If  is convex then 
 For every ,  where  is the smallest cone containing  (here, a set  is a cone if  for all  and all non-negative ).

Related sets

If instead of an affine combination one uses a convex combination, that is one requires in the formula above that all  be non-negative, one obtains the convex hull of S, which cannot be larger than the affine hull of S as more restrictions are involved. 
The notion of conical combination gives rise to the notion of the conical hull
If however one puts no restrictions at all on the numbers , instead of an affine combination one has a linear combination, and the resulting set is the linear span of S, which contains the affine hull of S.

References

 R.J. Webster, Convexity, Oxford University Press, 1994. .

Affine geometry
Closure operators